Iwa  is a village development committee in the Himalayas of Terhathum District in the Kosi Zone of eastern Nepal.

References

External links
UN map of the municipalities of Terhathum District

Populated places in Tehrathum District